Sicily is the largest region in Italy in terms of area, with a population of over five million and has contributed many famous names to all walks of life. Geographically, it is the largest and most populated island in the Mediterranean Sea.

This list includes notable natives of Sicily and its predecessor states, as well as those who were born elsewhere but spent a large part of their active life in Sicily. People of  Sicilian heritage and descent are in a separate section of this article. The Sicilian-Americans have a specific list.

Religious figures

Pantaenus (died 200 AD), theologian, saint
Agatha of Catania (231–251 AD), martyr and saint
Lucy of Syracuse (283–304 AD), martyr and saint
Saint Vitus (c. 290–c. 303 AD), martyr and saint
Euplius (died 304 AD), martyr and saint
Bassianus of Lodi (c. 320– c. 409), bishop and saint
Mamilian of Palermo (died 460), bishop and saint
Olivia of Palermo (448-463), martyr and saint
Pope Agatho (575–681), Pope from 678 to his death, saint
Pope Leo II (611–683), Pope from 682 to his death, saint
Pope Sergius I (650–701), Pope from 687 to his death, saint
Pope Stephen III (723–772), Pope from 768 to his death
Methodios I (788/800–847), Ecumenical Patriarch of Constantinople and saint
Leo Luke of Corleone (815–915), monk and saint
Joseph the Hymnographer (816–886), monk and saint
Elias of Enna (822 or 823–903), monk and saint
Symeon of Trier (980/990–1035), monk and saint
Filarete of Calabria (c. 1020–1070), monk and saint
John Theristus (1049–1129), monk and saint
Rosalia of Palermo (1130–1166), hermit and saint
Albert of Trapani (1240–1307), friar and saint
Agostino Novello (1240–1309), Augustinian friar, scholar and blessed
Nicolò de' Tudeschi "Panormitanus", (1386–1445), canonist, pseudocardinal
Pietro Geremia (1399–1452), Dominican preacher and blessed
Eustochia Smeralda Calafato (1434–1485), Franciscan hermitess and saint
Luigi Rabatà (1443–1490), Carmelite priest and blessed
Benedict the Moor (1526–1589), friar and saint
Giordano Ansaloni (1598–1634), Dominican missionary and saint
Bernard of Corleone (1605–1667), friar and saint
Prospero Intorcetta (1626–1696), Jesuit missionary
Giuseppe Maria Tomasi (1649–1713), Theatine priest, cardinal and saint
Giovanni Battista Sidotti (1668–1714), priest, missionary
Felix of Nicosia (1715–1787), Capuchin friar and saint
Giacomo Cusmano (1834–1888), priest and blessed
Mariano Rampolla (1843–1913), cardinal secretary of state
Annibale Maria di Francia (1851–1927), priest and saint
Carolina Santocanale (1852–1923), nun and blessed
Maria Crocifissa Curcio (1877–1957), Carmelite nun and blessed
Gabriele Allegra (1907–1976), Franciscan missionary, translator and blessed
Giuseppina Suriano (1915–1950), Catholic activist and blessed
Salvatore Pappalardo (1918–2006), archbishop and cardinal
Francesco Spoto (1924–1964), priest, missionary and blessed
Pino Puglisi (1937–1993), priest and blessed

Philosophers and scientists

Empedocles (c. 490–430 BC), scientist and philosopher
Acron (5th century BC), physician
Gorgias (c. 483–375 BC), philosopher
Hicetas (c. 400–c. 335 BC), philosopher
Monimus (c. 399–300 BC), philosopher
Menecrates of Syracuse (4th century BC), physician
Euhemerus (c. 330–250 a.C.), philosopher
Dicaearchus (c. 350–c. 285 BC), philosopher, cartographer, geographer, mathematician
Archimedes (c. 287 – 212 BC), engineer and mathematician
Constantine the African (c. 1020 – 1087), physician and translator
Giovanni Aurispa (1376–1459), anthropologist
Francesco Maurolico (1494–1575), mathematician
Giovanni Filippo Ingrassia (1510–1580), physician, anatomist
Giovanni Battista Hodierna (1597–1660), astronomer
Paolo Boccone (1633–1704), botanist
Tommaso Campailla (1668–1740), philosopher, doctor, poet
Francesco Paolo Cantelli (1875–1966), mathematician
Orso Mario Corbino (1876–1937), physicist
Leonardo Ximenes (1716–1786), mathematician, engineer, astronomer, geographer
Bernardino da Ucria (1739–1796), botanist
Giuseppe Piazzi (1746–1826), astronomer, discovered the minor planet Ceres
Niccolò Cacciatore (1780–1841), astronomer
Vincenzo Tineo (1791–1856), botanist
Gioacchino Ventura di Raulica (1792–1861), philosopher
Filippo Parlatore (1816–1877), botanist
Stanislao Cannizzaro (1826–1910), chemist
Giuseppe Seguenza (1833–1889),  naturalist, geologist
Giuseppe Sergi (1841–1936), anthropologist
Gaetano Mosca (1858–1941), political scientist
Silvio Micali (born 1954), computer scientists and Turing award recipient
Gaspare Mignosi (1875–1951), mathematician
Gaetano Fichera (1922–1996), mathematician
Giuseppe Lauricella (1867–1913), mathematician
Giovanni Gentile (1875–1944), philosopher
José Ingenieros (1877–1925), physician, pharmacist, philosopher
Michele Cipolla (1880–1947), mathematician
Mauro Picone (1885–1977), mathematician
Giuseppe Oddo (1865–1954), chemist
Emanuele Paternò (1847–1935), chemist
Giuseppe Mario Bellanca (1886–1960), aviation inventor
Giovanni Sansone (1888–1979), mathematician
David J. Impastato (1903–1986), neuropsychiatrist
Giuseppe Gabrielli (1903–1987), aeronautics engineer
Michele Parrinello (born 1945), physicist
Antonino Lo Surdo (1880–1949), physicist
Ettore Majorana (1906–1997), physicist
Quirino Majorana (1871–1957), physicist
Antonino Zichichi (born 1929), physicist
Luca Parmitano (born 1976), engineer and astronaut
Vito Latora (born 1971), physicist
Flavia Sparacino (born 1966)
Napoleone Ferrara (born 1956)

Writers and journalists

Epicharmus of Kos (c. 524–c. 435 BC), comic poet, dramatist, philosopher
Antiochus of Syracuse (5th century BC), historian
Corax of Syracuse (5th century BC), rhetorician
Sophron (5th century BC), writer of mimes
Lysias (c. 445–c. 380 BC), logographer, jurist 
Philistus (c. 432–356 BC), historian
Carcinus (c. 420–360 BC), dramatist
Archestratus (4th century BC), poet
Timaeus (c. 345–250 BC), historian
Rhinthon (c. 323–285 BC), dramatist
Theocritus (c. 310–250 BC), poet
Diodorus Siculus (c. 90–30 BC), historian
Julius Firmicus Maternus (4th century AD), writer, astrologer
Ibn Hamdis (1056–1133), poet
Eugenius of Palermo (c. 1130–1202), translator
Cielo d'Alcamo (13th century), poet
Nina Siciliana (13th century), poet
Stefano Protonotaro da Messina (13th century), poet
Giacomo da Lentini (1210–1260), poet
Guido Delle Colonne (1215–1290), poet
Antonio Beccadelli (1394–1471), poet, historian
Pietro Ranzano (1428–1492), historian
Lucio Marineo (1444–1533), humanist, historian
Giovanni Luca Barberi (1452–1520), historian
Cataldo Parisio (1455–1517), humanist
Tommaso Fazello (1498–1570), historian
Nicoletta Pasquale (16th century), poet
Antonio Veneziano (1543–1593), poet
Sebastiano Bagolino (1562–1604), poet, scholar
Pietro Fullone (1600–1670), poet
Filadelfo Mugnos (1607–1675), historian, genealogist, poet
Giuseppe Artale (1632–1679), poet
Giovanni Meli (1740–1815), poet
Domenico Tempio (1750–1821), poet
Michele Amari (1806–1889), historian, orientalist, politician
Gabriele Dara (1826–1885), Arbëreshë poet, politician
Luigi Capuana (1839–1915), writer
Giovanni Verga (1840–1922), novelist
Giuseppe Pitrè (1841–1916), historian
Mario Rapisardi (1844–1912), poet
Napoleone Colajanni (1847–1921), writer, journalist, politician
Pietro Gori (1865–1911), journalist, poet
Luigi Pirandello (1867–1936), dramatist, Nobel laureate
Nino Martoglio (1870–1921), writer, dramatist
Maria Messina (1887–1944), writer of short fiction, novelist
Giuseppe Tomasi di Lampedusa (1896–1957), writer, poet
Ignazio Buttitta (1899–1997), poet
Salvatore Quasimodo (1901–1968), poet, Nobel laureate
Ercole Patti (1903–1976), writer
Vitaliano Brancati (1907–1954), writer
Elio Vittorini (1908–1966), writer
Helle Busacca (1915–1996), poet
Gesualdo Bufalino (1920–1996), writer
Leonardo Sciascia (1921–1989), writer, politician
Vince Colletta (1923–1991),  comic book artist, art director
Andrea Camilleri (1925–2019), novelist
Giuseppe Fava (1925–1984), writer and dramatist
Mario Francese (1925–1979), journalist
Maria Costa (1926–2016), poet
Candido Cannavò (1930–2009) sports journalist
Santi Visalli (born 1932), photojournalist
Vincenzo Consolo (1933–2012), novelist
Dacia Maraini (born 1936), novelist
Gaetano Cipolla (born 1937), Sicilian-to-English translator, author, publisher of the journal Arba Sicula
Emma Baeri (born 1942), feminist historian, political scientist
Peppino Impastato (1948–1978), journalist, political activist
Marcello Sorgi (born 1955), writer,  journalist
Lara Cardella (born 1969), novelist
Melissa Panarello (born 1985), novelist

Rulers, monarchs and warriors

Phalaris (died 555 or 554 BC), tyrant of Akragas
Theron (c. 535–472 BC), tyrant of Akragas
Diocles of Syracuse (5th century BC), legislator and military leader
Gelo (died 478 BC), tyrant of Gela and Syracuse
Hiero I (died 467 or 466), tyrant of Gela and Syracuse
Ducetius (died 440 BC), king of the Sicels
Dionysius I (432 – 367 BC), tyrant of Syracuse
Dion (408 – 354 BC), tyrant of Syracuse, friend of Plato
Hermocrates (died 407 BC), Syracusan general
Charondas (4th century), lawgiver
Dionysius II (397 – 343 BC), tyrant of Syracuse
Timoleon (411 – 337 BC), tyrant of Syracuse
Agathocles (361 – 289 BC), tyrant of Syracuse
Hicetas of Leontini (died 338 BC), tyrant of Leontini
Hiero II (c. 308–c. 215 BC), tyrant of Syracuse
Antander (4th century BC–3rd century BC), strategos
Epicydes (3rd century BC), tyrant of Syracuse
Lanassa (3rd century BC), queen consort of Epirus and Macedon
Hieronymus, (231–214 BC), tyrant of Syracuse
Euphemius (9th century AD), admiral
al-Hasan al-Kalbi (r. 948 – 964 AD), founder of the Emirate of Sicily
Jawhar al-Siqilli (966–992), general of the Fatimid Caliphate
Roger I (1031–1101), founder of the County of Sicily
Felicia (1078–1102), queen consort of Hungary
Roger II (1095-1154), king of Sicily
William I (1131–1166), king of Sicily
William II (1155–1189), king of Sicily
Tancred (1138–1194), king of Sicily
William III (1186–1198), king of Sicily
Constance I (1154–1198), queen of Sicily, Holy Roman Empress
Frederick II (1194–1250), king of Sicily, Holy Roman Emperor
Henry VII (1211–1242), king of Sicily and Germany
Manfred (1232–1266), king of Sicily
Constance II (1249–1302), queen consort of Aragon and Sicily
Frederick III (1272–1337), king of Sicily
Peter II (1304–1342), king of Sicily
Constance (1305–1344), queen consort of Jerusalem and Cyprus and Armenia
Eleanor (1325–1375), queen consort of Aragon
Louis (1338–1355), king of Sicily
Frederick IV (1341–1377), king of Sicily
Maria (1363–1401), queen of Sicily
Costanza Chiaramonte (1377–1423), queen consort of Naples
Ferdinand II (1810–1859), king of the Two Sicilies

Politicians, civil servants and military personnel
 

Leopoldo de Gregorio, Marquess of Squillace (1699–1785), statesman
Federico Carlo Gravina (1756–1806), admiral of Spain
Francesco Paolo Di Blasi (1753/1755–1795), jurist, revolutionary
Carlo Cottone (1756–1829), politician
Ruggero Settimo (1776–1863), politician
Giuseppe La Farina (1815–1863), politician
Giuseppe Natoli (1815–1867), politician
Francesco Crispi (1819–1901), politician, 11th Prime Minister of Italy
Emanuele Notarbartolo (1834–1893), politician
Antonio Starabba, Marquess of Rudinì (1839–1908), politician, 12th Prime Minister of Italy
Antonino Paternò Castello, Marquess of San Giuliano (1852–1914), diplomat and Minister of Foreign Affairs
Vittorio Emanuele Orlando (1860–1952), politician, 23rd Prime Minister of Italy
Pietro Lanza di Scalea (1863–1938), politician
Luigi Sturzo (1871–1959), politician
Guido Jung (1876–1949), banker, politician
Andrea Finocchiaro Aprile (1878–1964), politician
Gaspare Ambrosini (1886–1986), judge, politician
Luigi Rizzo (1887–1951), admiral
Gaetano Martino (1900–1967), politician
Vincent R. Impellitteri (1900–1987), politician, mayor of New York City
Mario Scelba (1901–1991), politician
Filippo Anfuso (1901–1963), diplomat, politician
Ugo La Malfa (1903–1979), politician
Giorgio La Pira (1904–1977), politician
Giuseppe Alessi (1905–2009), politician
Antonio Canepa (1908–1945), politician, revolutionary
Placido Rizzotto (1914–1948), trade union leader
Antonino Caponnetto (1920–2002), judge
Cesare Terranova (1921–1979), judge, politician
Rocco Chinnici (1925–1983), judge
Pio La Torre (1927–1982), politician
Boris Giuliano (1930–1979), policeman
Piersanti Mattarella (1935–1980), politician
Giovanni Falcone (1939–1992), judge
Paolo Borsellino (1940–1992), judge
Sergio Mattarella (born 1941), judge, politician, current president of Italy
Antonio Martino (born 1942), politician
Pietro Grasso (born 1945), judge, politician
Ninni Cassarà (1947–1985), policeman
Ignazio La Russa (born 1947), politician
Leoluca Orlando (born 1947), politician
Renato Schifani (born 1950), politician
Rosario Livatino (1952–1990), judge
Anna Finocchiaro (born 1955), politician
Angelino Alfano (born 1970), politician
Alfonso Bonafede (born 1976), politician
Antonin Scalia (1936–2016), U.S. Supreme Court Associate Justice

Painters, sculptors and architects

Antonello da Messina (1430–1479), painter
Riccardo Quartararo (1443–1506), painter
Girolamo Alibrandi (1470–1524), painter
Antonello Gagini (1478–1536), sculptor
Giacomo del Duca (1520–1604), sculptor, architect
Tommaso Laureti (1530–1602), painter
Natale Masuccio (1561–1619), Jesuit architect
Mariano Smiriglio (1561–1636), architect, painter
Mario Minniti (1577–1640), painter
Alonzo Rodriguez (1578–1648), painter
Antonio Barbalonga (1600–1649), painter
Pietro Novelli (1603–1647), painter
Giovanni Quagliata (1603–1673), painter
Onofrio Gabrielli (1619–1706), painter
Agostino Scilla (1629–1700), painter
Angelo Italia (1628–1700), Jesuit architect
Filippo Tancredi (1655–1722), painter
Gaetano Giulio Zumbo (1656–1701), sculptor
Filippo Juvarra (1678–1736), architect
Rosario Gagliardi (1698–1762), architect
Giovanni Battista Vaccarini (1702–1768), architect
Pietro Novelli (1603–1647), painter
Giacomo Serpotta (1656–1732), sculptor
Olivio Sòzzi (1696–1765), painter
Giovanni Antonio Medrano (1703–1760), architect
Vincenzo Sinatra (1720–1765), architect
Francesco Sabatini (1722–1797), architect
Giuseppe Venanzio Marvuglia (1729–1814), architect
Mariano Rossi (1731–1807), painter
Giuseppe Velazquez (1750–1827), painter
Giuseppe Cammarano (1766–1850), painter
Michele Rapisardi (1822–1886), painter
Giovan Battista Filippo Basile (1825–1891), architect
Francesco Lojacono (1838–1915), painter
Vitaliano Poselli (1838–1918), architect
Vincenzo Ragusa (1841–1927), sculptor
Ettore Ximenes (1855–1926), sculptor
Ernesto Basile (1857–1932), architect
Mario Rutelli (1859–1941), sculptor
Giorgio de Chirico (1888–1978), painter
Francisco Salamone (1897–1959), architect
Giuseppe Migneco (1908–1997), painter
Renato Guttuso (1912–1987), painter
Emilio Greco (1913–1995), sculptor,
Topazia Alliata (1913–2015), painter, art curator
Salvatore Fiume (1915–1997), painter, sculptor, architect
Pietro Consagra (1920–2005), sculptor
Bruno Caruso (1927–2018), painter, illustrator, graphic designer
Arturo Di Modica (born 1941), sculptor
Emanuele Viscuso (born 1952), sculptor
Manfredi Beninati (born 1970), visual artist

Musicians

Sigismondo d'India (1582–1629), composer
Alessandro Scarlatti (1660–1725), composer
Emanuele d'Astorga (1680–1757), composer
Pietro Antonio Coppola (1793–1876), composer, conductor
Giovanni Pacini (1796–1867), composer
Mario Aspa (1797–1868), composer
Vincenzo Bellini (1801–1835), opera composer
Errico Petrella (1813–1877), opera composer
Corrado Galzio (1919–2020), musician and piano player
Antonino Gandolfo Brancaleone (1820–1888), composer
Achille Campisiano (1837–1908), pianist, composer
Roberto Stagno (1840–1897), tenor
Mario Sammarco (1868–1930), baritone
Giuseppe Anselmi (1876–1929), tenor
Vincent Rose (1880–1944), violinist, pianist, composer
Ignacio Corsini (1891–1967), folklore and tango musician
Santa Biondo (1892–1989), soprano
Salvatore Allegra (1898–1993), composer
Franco Ferrara (1911–1985), conductor
Giuseppe Di Stefano (1921–2008), operatic tenor
Rosa Balistreri (1927–1990),  singer 
Roberto Pregadio (1928–2010), composer, conductor, TV personality
Pippo Caruso (1935–2018), composer, conductor
Tony Cucchiara (1937–2018), singer, composer
Umberto Balsamo (born 1942), singer-songwriter
Salvatore Adamo (born 1943), singer
Nico dei Gabbiani (1944–2012), singer
Aldo Stellita (1944–1998), composer, musician, member of Matia Bazar
Franco Battiato (1945–2021), musician, filmmaker
Gianni Bella (born 1945), singer-songwriter, composer
Cristiano Malgioglio (born 1945), singer-songwriter, composer
Salvatore Sciarrino (born 1947), composer
Christian (born 1949), singer
Frédéric François (born 1950), singer
Giuni Russo (1951–2004), singer-songwriter
Marcella Bella (born 1952), singer
Vincenzo Spampinato (born 1953), singer-songwriter
Luca Madonia (born 1957), singer-songwriter
Giovanni Sollima (born 1962), composer, cellist
Lucia Aliberti (born 1963), operatic soprano
Rosario Di Bella (born 1963), singer-songwriter
Mario Venuti (born 1963), singer-songwriter, producer
Marcello Giordani (1963–2019), tenor
Gerardina Trovato (born 1967), singer
Salvatore Di Vittorio (born 1967), composer
Francesca Alotta (born 1968), singer
Roy Paci (born 1969), trumpeter, singer-songwriter
Jeffrey Jey (born 1970), singer-songwriter, member of Eiffel 65
Paolo Buonvino (born 1970), composer, conductor, music arranger
Mario Biondi (born 1971), singer
Filippa Giordano (born 1974), singer
Carmen Consoli (born 1974), singer-songwriter
Misstress Barbara (born 1975), DJ, singer-songwriter
Antonino Fogliani (born 1976), conductor
Desirée Rancatore (born 1977), soprano
Vincenzo Luvineri (born 1977) rapper AKA Vinnie Paz
Silvia Salemi (born 1978), singer-songwriter
Marracash (born 1979), rapper
Giusy Ferreri (born 1979), singer
Romina Arena (born 1980), singer
Oriana Civile (born 1980), singer and ethnomusicologist
Cristina Scuccia (born 1988), singer
Francesco Cafiso (born 1989), jazz saxophonist
Giovanni Caccamo (born 1990), singer-songwriter
Deborah Iurato (born 1991), singer
Piero Barone (born 1993), singer, member of Il Volo
Lorenzo Fragola (born 1995), singer
La Bionda, composers, record producers

Actors, directors and producers

Angelo Musco (1872–1937), actor
Ernesto Almirante (1877–1964), actor
Febo Mari (1884–1939), actor, director
Mimi Aguglia (1884–1970), actress
Henry Armetta (1888–1945), actor
Sol Polito (1892–1960), cinematographer
Piero Carnabuci (1893–1958), actor
Frank Capra (1897–1991), actor, director
Rosina Anselmi (1880–1965), actress
Michele Abruzzo (1904–1996), actor
Rocco D'Assunta (1904–1970), actor
Salvo Randone (1906–1991), actor
Pino Mercanti (1911–1986), director, screenwriter
Gino Buzzanca (1912–1985), actor
Ignazio Balsamo (1912–1994), actor
Saro Urzì (1913–1979), actor
Mario Landi (1920–1992), director
Turi Ferro (1921–2001), actor
Adolfo Celi (1922–1986), actor
Ciccio Ingrassia (1922–2003), actor, director
Turi Vasile (1922–2009), producer, director
Vittorio De Seta (1923–2011), director
Nino Terzo (1923–2005), actor
Carlo Sposito (1924–1984), actor
Roberto Mauri (1924–2007),  actor, director
Carla Calò (1926–2019), actress
Franco Franchi (1928–1992), actor
Massimo Mollica (1929–2013), actor, theatre director
Luigi Vannucchi (1930–1978), actor 
Franco Indovina (1932–1972), director, screenwriter
Michele Lupo (1932–1989), director 
Pino Caruso (1934–2019), actor, author, TV personality
Tuccio Musumeci (born 1934), actor
Aldo Puglisi (born 1935), actor
Robert Hundar (1935–2008), actor
Daniela Rocca (1937–1995), actress, model
Biagio Pelligra (born 1937), actor
Lando Buzzanca (born 1938), actor
Michele Gammino (born 1941), actor
Elio Zamuto (born 1941), actor
Luigi Maria Burruano (1945–2017), actor
Leo Gullotta (born 1946), actor
Beppe Cino (born 1947), director
Carla Cassola (born 1947), actress
Nino Frassica (born 1950), actor
Jerry Calà (born 1951), actor, comedian
Andrea Tidona (born 1951), actor
Antonio Catania (born 1952), actor
Lucia Sardo (born 1952), actress
Frank Sivero (born 1952), actor
Riccardo Schicchi (1953–2012), director, producer
Tony Sperandeo (born 1953), actor
Giuseppe Tornatore (born 1956), director
Aurelio Grimaldi (born 1957), director
Donatella Maiorca (born 1957), director
Franco Maresco (born 1958), director
Roberto Andò (born 1959), director
Anna Kanakis (born 1962), model, actress
Daniele Ciprì (born 1962), director
Ninni Bruschetta (born 1962), actor, director
Enrico Lo Verso (born 1964), actor
Vincenzo Amato (born 1966), actor
Luigi Lo Cascio (born 1967), actor
Francesco Benigno (born 1967), actor
Salvatore Termini (born 1968), actor
Giuseppe Fiorello (born 1969), actor
Maria Grazia Cucinotta (born 1969), actress
Donatella Finocchiaro (born 1970), actress
Dario Bandiera (born 1970), actor, comedian
Ficarra e Picone (born 1971), actors, comedians
Lorenzo Crespi (born 1971), actor
Luca Guadagnino (born 1971), director
Pif (born 1972), actor, director
Paolo Briguglia (born 1974), actor
Loredana Cannata (born 1975), actress
Claudio Gioè (born 1975), actor
Barbara Tabita (born 1975), actress
Tiziana Lodato (born 1976), actress
Daniele Gangemi (born 1980), director
Nicole Grimaudo (born 1980), actress
Isabella Ragonese (born 1981), actress
Francesco Scianna (born 1982), actor
Margareth Madè (born 1982), actress
Valeria Bilello (born 1982), actress, model
Tea Falco (born 1986), actress
Chazz Palminteri (born 1952), actor

Sports figures 
Paolo Boi (1528–1598), chess player
Pietro Speciale (1876–1945), fencer, gold medal in the team foil at the 1920 Antwerp Olympics
Giovanni Canova (1880–1960), fencer (gold medal at the 1920 Summer Olympics)
Francesco Calì (1882–1949), footballer
Johnny Dundee (1893–1965), boxer
Francesco Gargano (1899–1975), fencer and the first Sicilian to win a gold medal at the 1920 Antwerp Olympics
Giovanni Corrieri (1920–2017), road bicycle racer
Concetto Lo Bello (1924–1991), football referee
Enzo Maiorca (1931–2016),  free diver
Guido Messina (1931–2020), road bicycle racer (gold medal with the Italian team at the 1952 Summer Olympics)
Nino Vaccarella (born 1933), racecar driver
Franco Scoglio (1941–2005),  football manager
Giuseppe Furino (born 1946), footballer
Tullio Lanese (born 1947), football referee
Pietro Anastasi (1948–2020), footballer
Giovanni Scalzo (born 1959), fencer (gold medal in the team sabre event at the 1984 Summer Olympics)
Salvatore Antibo (born 1962), runner
Pasquale Marino (born 1962), footballer, football manager
Alessandro Campagna (water polo) (born 1963), water polo player and coach
Salvatore Schillaci (born 1964), footballer
Maurizio Randazzo (born 1964), fencer (gold medal in the team épée events at the 1996 and 2000 Summer Olympics)
Annarita Sidoti (1969–2015), race walker
Andrea Lo Cicero (born 1976),  rugby union player
Valerio Vermiglio (born 1976), volleyball player
Paolo Tiralongo (born 1977), road bicycle racer
Giuseppe Gibilisco (born 1979), pole vaulter
Silvia Bosurgi (born 1979), water polo player (gold medal with the Women's National Team at the 2004 Summer Olympics)
Giuseppe Mascara (born 1979), footballer
Giovanni Visconti (born 1983), road bicycle racer
Vincenzo Nibali (born 1984), road bicycle racer
Tony Cairoli (born 1985), eight-time Grand Prix motocross world champion
Luca Marin (born 1986), medley swimmer
Damiano Caruso (born 1987), road bicycle racer
Giorgio Avola (born 1989), fencer (gold medal at the 2012 Summer Olympics in the men's team foil event)
Mario Balotelli (born 1990), footballer
Daniele Garozzo (born 1992), foil fencer (gold medal in the Men's Individual Foil at the 2016 Summer Olympics)
Marco Cecchinato (born 1992), tennis player
Miriam Sylla (born 1995), volleyball player

Criminals

Others

Phrygillus (5th century BC), medallist and engraver of precious stones
Eunus (died 132 BC),  leader of the slave uprising in the First Servile War
Dina and Clarenza (13th century), heroines during the Sicilian Vespers
Manfredi Chiaramonte (died 1391), nobleman
Aaron Abualrabi (1400–1450), Jewish scholar, cabalist, and astrologer
Laura Lanza, Baroness of Carini (1529–1563), noblewoman
Juan Dominguez Palermo (c.1560–1635), conquistador
Procopio Cutò (1651–1727), chef
Giovanna Bonanno (1713–1789), alleged  witch and poisoner
Count Alessandro di Cagliostro (1743–1795), traveller, occultist
Lucia Migliaccio (1770–1826), second wife of the king Ferdinand I of the Two Sicilies
Pietro Bachi (1787–1853), professor
Giuseppa Bolognara Calcagno (1826–1884), freedom fighter
Joseph Whitaker (1850–1936),  ornithologist, archaeologist and sportsman
Maria Paternò Arezzo (1869–1908), noblewoman, philanthropist
Ignazio Florio Jr. (1869–1957), entrepreneur
Franca Florio (1873–1950), noblewoman, socialite
Vincenzo Florio (1883–1959), entrepreneur and founder of the Targa Florio race
Frank Lentini (1884/1889–1966), showman
Josephine Terranova (1889–1981), accused murderer
Fulco di Verdura (1898–1978), jeweller
Nunzio Filogamo (1902–2002), television and radio presenter
Bernard Castro (1904–1991), inventor
Nicolò Carosio (1907–1984), sport journalist
Raimondo Lanza di Trabia (1915–1954), soldier, diplomat, sportsman
Rosalia Lombardo (1918–1920), known as the Sleeping Beauty
Renzo Barbera (1920–2002),  businessman and sportsman
Salvatore Giuliano (1922–1950), bandit
Danilo Dolci (1924–1997), social activist, sociologist
Enzo Sellerio (1924–2012), photographer, publisher, and collector
Libero Grassi (1924–1991), manufacturer and antimafia activist
Paolo Giaccone (1929–1982) professor, forensic pathologist and Mafia’s victim 
Nuccio Costa (1925–1991), television presenter
Pino Zac (1930–1985), illustrator
Pippo Baudo (born 1936), television presenter
Giuseppe Coco (1936–2012), illustrator
Lino Saputo (born 1937), businessman
Giucas Casella (born 1949),  illusionist, hypnotist
Michele Cucuzza (born 1955), television presenter 
Domenico Dolce (born 1958), fashion designer
Rosario Fiorello (born 1960), singer, television personality
Pietro Scalia (born 1960), film editor
Angelo d'Arrigo (1961–2006), aviator
Fabrizio Corona (born 1974), photographer, actor, television personality
Eleonora Abbagnato (born 1978), ballet dancer, model
Eva Riccobono (born 1983), model
Miriam Leone (born 1985), model, television personality
Diletta Leotta (born 1991), television personality

Notable people of Sicilian descent by birthplace

Europe
Italy:

Giulio Raimondo Mazzarino (1602–1661), cardinal and Chief minister of France
Domenico Scarlatti (1685–1757), composer
Luigi Almirante (1884–1963), actor
Giorgio de Chirico (1888–1978), painter
Totò (1898–1967), actor
Julius Evola (1898–1974), political philosopher, esotericist, painter
Giuseppe Giovanni Lanza del Vasto (1901–1981), philosopher, poet, artist
Pietro Ingrao (1915-2015), politician 
Enrico Maria Salerno (1926–1994), actor
Emanuele Severino (1929–2020), philosopher
Bartolomeo Sorge (1929-2020), Jesuit 
Paolo Villaggio (1932–2017), actor
Sophia Loren (born 1934), actress
Bettino Craxi (1934–2000), politician, former Prime Minister of Italy
Giuliano Amato (born 1938), politician, former Prime Minister of Italy
Giorgio La Malfa (born 1939), politician
Toto Cutugno (born 1943), singer-songwriter
Beppe Grillo (born 1948), actor and politician 
Gaetano Scirea (born 1953), footballer
Francesco Rutelli (born 1954), Mayor of Rome
Michele Serra (born 1954), writer and journalist
Ignazio Marino (born 1955), Mayor of Rome
Sergio Scariolo (born 1961), basketball coach 
Amadeus (born 1962), Tv presenter 
Antonio Albanese (born 1964), actor
Paolo Virzì (born 1964), film director, writer, producer
Max Gazzè (born 1967), singer-songwriter
Gianluigi Lentini (born 1969), footballer
Stefan Schwoch (born 1969), footballer
Massimo Oddo (born 1976), footballer 
Giorgia Meloni (born 1977), politician
Luca Argentero (born 1978), actor 
Sebastian Giovinco (born 1987), footballer
Vito Mannone (born 1988), footballer
Roberto Gagliardini (born 1994), footballer
Nicola Cabibbo (born 1935), physicist
Dario Argento (born 1940), film director

Belgium:
Enzo Scifo (born 1966), footballer, football manager
Lara Fabian (born 1970), singer
Silvio Proto (born 1983), footballer

France:
Jean-Paul Belmondo (born 1933), actor
Roberto Alagna (born 1963), tenor
Jean Alesi (born 1964), Formula One driver
Nathalie Cardone (born 1967), actress, singer
Alexandre del Valle (born 1968), writer, professor, columnist
Calogero (born 1971), singer
Fabio Quartararo (born 1999), motorcycle racer

Germany:
Ralph Giordano (1923–2014), writer
Lou Bega (born 1975), singer
Vincenzo Grifo (born 1993), footballer

Switzerland:
Sébastien Buemi (1988), Formula One driver

United Kingdom:
Gia Scala (1934–1972), actress
Tony Iommi (born 1948), guitarist
Ronnie O'Sullivan (born 1975), professional snooker player
Luke Pasqualino (born 1990), actor
Nico Mirallegro (born 1991), actor

Africa
Algeria:
Edwige Fenech (born 1948), actress

Libya:
Claudio Gentile (born 1953), footballer, football manager

Tunisia:
Sandra Milo (born 1933), actress
Claudia Cardinale (born 1938), actress
Claude Bartolone (born 1951), politician, former President of the National Assembly of France

America
Argentina:
Salvador Mazza (1886–1946), physician, epidemiologist
Argentina Brunetti (1907–2005), actress
René Favaloro (1923–2000), cardiac surgeon
Duilio Marzio (1923–2013), actor
Alfredo Di Stéfano (1926–2014), footballer, football manager
Carlos Bilardo (born 1939), footballer, football manager
Alfio Basile (born 1943), footballer, football manager 
Ricardo Bochini (born 1954), footballer 
Martín Palermo (born 1973), footballer 
Gabriel Heinze (born 1978), footballer 
Florencia Bertotti (born 1983), actress, singer
Javier Mascherano (born 1984), footballer 
Federico Fazio (born 1987), footballer 
Leonel Vangioni (born 1987), footballer

Canada:
Yvonne De Carlo (1987–2007), actress, dancer, singer
Joey Saputo (born 1964), businessman, sportsman
Michael Cammalleri (born 1982), ice hockey player
Carmelina Moscato (born 1984), soccer player
Michael Cera (born 1994), actor, musician

United States:
List of Sicilian-Americans

Australia
Australia:
Tina Arena (born 1967), singer-songwriter
Natalie Imbruglia (born 1975), singer, actress
The Veronicas (born 1984), singers
Daniel Ricciardo (born 1989), Formula One driver

Footnotes

See also
Sicilian-Americans
List of Sicilian-Americans

Sicily
Sicily